This is a list of equipment of the armed forces of the Donetsk People's Republic and Luhansk People's Republic currently used in the Russo-Ukrainian War.

Small arms

Pistols

Submachine guns

Shotguns

Bolt-action rifles

Semi-automatic rifles

Assault rifles

Precision rifles

Anti-materiel rifles

Machine guns

Explosives/armor-piercing weapons

Grenades and grenade launchers

Mines

Anti-tank

Flamethrowers

Vehicles
The ongoing war makes the list below include tentative estimates.

Tanks

Infantry fighting vehicles

Armoured personnel carriers

Armored scout vehicles

Armoured recovery vehicles

Military engineering vehicles

Minelayers

Trenchers

Light armored vehicles

Logistics and utility vehicles

Artillery

Mortars

Field artillery

Self-propelled field artillery

Rocket artillery

Air Defences

Towed anti-aircraft gun

Air defense vehicles

Man-portable air-defense systems

Electronic warfare

Aircraft

Combat jets

Helicopters

Unmanned aerial vehicles

Ships

See also 

 List of Russo-Ukrainian conflict military equipment
 List of equipment of the Russian Ground Forces

References

War in Donbas
Separatist forces of the war in Donbas
Donbas